Flexiseps crenni is a species of skink, a lizard in the family Scincidae. The species is endemic to Madagascar.

Etymology
The specific name, crenni, is in honor of ophthalmologist Louis Crenn, who presented the holotype to Mocquard.

Habitat
The preferred natural habitat of F. crenni is forest.

Description
F. crenni has very short legs with a reduced number of digits. Each front foot has 2–3 digits, and each back foot has 2–4 digits.

Reproduction
The mode of reproduction of F. crenni is unknown.

References

Further reading
Andreone F, Greer AE (2002). "Malagasy scincid lizards: descriptions of nine new species, with notes on the morphology, reproduction and taxonomy of some previously described species (Reptilia, Squamata: Scincidae)". Journal of Zoology 258: 139–181. (Amphiglossus crenni, new combination).
Erens J, Miralles A, Glaw F, Chatrou LW, Vences M (2017). "Extended molecular phylogenetics and revised systematics of Malagasy scincine lizards". Molecular Phylogenetics and Evolution 107: 466–472. (Flexiceps crenni, new combination).
Glaw F, Vences M (2006). A Field Guide to the Amphibians and Reptiles of Madagascar, Third Edition. Cologne, Germany: Vences & Glaw Verlag. 496 pp. .
Mocquard F (1906). "Descriptions de quelques Reptiles et d'un Batracien d'espèces nouvelles ". Bulletin du Museum National d'Histoire Naturelle 12: 247–253. (Sepsina crenni, new species, pp. 247–248). (in French).

Reptiles of Madagascar
Reptiles described in 1906
Flexiseps
Taxa named by François Mocquard